Mudgeeraba Soccer Club is a semi-professional soccer club based in Mudgeeraba, Queensland, Australia. The club competes in the Football Queensland Premier League 4 − South Coast, the second flight of the Football Queensland South Coast administrative division and the sixth flight of the Australian soccer league system. 

The club's home ground is the Sid Bigg Park and since foundation in 1980, the club has been a regular competitor in the Gold Coast Premier League. However, the club currently competes in the second division, following relegation from the Gold Coast Premier League after the 2019 season. The club's senior men's team has won 1 First Division Premiership, 2 First Division Championships and 1 First Division President's Cup.

History 
With the interest of developing junior sport, an inaugural meeting of the Mudgeeraba Sports Club was held on 22 May 1979. Mudgeeraba Sports Club acquired a lease of Sid Bigg Park, where the club was able to foster Tennis, Table tennis and Cricket for foundation members. 

In 1979, following a successful fundraising dinner, soccer was introduced and the first junior games were played in 1980. In 1986 a clubhouse was built, allowing for senior soccer to commence in 1987.

The senior men's team statistics are only traceable to the 2003 season of the Gold Coast Premier League, a period which has seen three relegations to the second division of Football South Coast, and two returning promotions. Mudgeeraba Soccer Club has various appearances in first and second division finals series and Australia Cup preliminary appearances.

Seasons

Men's Senior Team

1987–2013: President's Cup and First Division success 
According to the club, senior football began in 1987. Mudgeeraba Soccer Club's earliest mention in records was when the First Division's top goalscorer, D.Mann, recorded 24 goals for the club in the 1998 season. This is because league tables were only available from 2003 onwards. The Men's senior team won their first trophy that was administered by Football Gold Coast (today known as Football Queensland South Coast) in the 1999 season after they won the First Division's championship. Mudgeeraba Soccer Club won their first First Division's President's Cup the following season. Following a spell in the Gold Coast Premier League, the club was relegated in 2009, and in 2011 the club won both the first division premiership and championship to return to the Gold Coast Premier League with the club's first double. The President's Cup was discontinued in 2008.

The tiers in the above table is the level according to The Football Queensland South Coast zone system, Sources

2014 – present: Establishment of FFA Cup and Mediocrity 
The FFA Cup's first season was held in 2014 (known as the Australia Cup since 2022), giving a chance for clubs of small stature to compete at a state and national level. Mudgeeraba Soccer Club's first and best performance came in the 2015 season reaching the fourth round after beating Coomera Colts and Murwillumbah. Their FFA Cup run would end following a 2-0 defeat to Broadbeach United. 

The tiers in the above table is the level according to The Football Queensland South Coast zone system, Sources

Academy graduates 
This is a list of former Mudgeeraba S.C. academy graduates who have gone on to represent their country at full international level.

Men 

  Lyndon Dykes

Women 

  Tameka Yallop

Honours

Football South Coast 

 FQPL 3 − South Coast / Gold Coast Premier League (first tier) 
 Championship
Runner-up: 2013, 2014
 FQPL 4 − South Coast / Men's Coast League 1 / First Division (second tier)
 Premiership
Winners (1): 2011
Runner-up: 2017
Championship
Winners (2): 1999, 2011
Runner-up: 2000, 2001, 2017
President's Cup
Winners (1): 2000 
Runner-up: 2001

See also 

 Football Queensland South Coast

References

External links
 

Association football clubs established in 1980
1980 establishments in Australia
Soccer teams on the Gold Coast, Queensland